Velleia glabrata (or Pee the bed) is an annual herb in the family Goodeniaceae, which is native to  all mainland states and territories of Australia with the exception of Victoria.
It grows on sand and clay, flowering from June to October.

The Australian Plant Name Index indicates that the species was first described as Velleia glabrata by Carolin in 1967.  However, FloraBase gives 1968 as the date of publication by Carolin, but cites the same publication. (There are no synonyms.)

Gallery

References

External links 
 The Australasian Virtual Herbarium – Occurrence data for Velleia glabrata.
 Eflora SA: Velleia glabrata. Electronic Flora of South Australia species Fact Sheet.
 PlantNET - FloraOnline Velleia glabrata.
 Flora NT Northern Territory flora online: Velleia glabrata.

glabrata
Eudicots of Western Australia
Flora of South Australia
Flora of New South Wales
Flora of Queensland
Flora of the Northern Territory
Taxa named by Roger Charles Carolin
Plants described in 1967